Gorky Central Park of Culture and Leisure is a central urban park in Rostov-on-Don, Rostov oblast, Russia, named after Maxim Gorky. It is the eldest park in Rostov-on-Don. The park was established in 1813 on the skirts of the city. Now it is located in center of Rostov-on-Don between Pushkinskaya street (Gorky Park North), Bolshaya Sadovaya street (Gorky Park South), Budyonovskiy avenue (Gorky Park West) and Semashko lane (Gorky Park East). 
Since 1998 the park is protected as an object of cultural heritage of regional value.

History
The park was established in arroyos, where dirty stream ran. Town dump occupied this place. Mayor of Rostov-on-Don Alexander Yashchenko owned the territory. He handed it to the city magistrate. Different private organizations improved the territory. The first trees, shrubs, and plants were transplanted to the park. There were several gardens initially, which were combined into the new urban park.  The so-called Lower Park (Nizhny Park) and Upper Park (Verhny Park) has been formed through the terrain.  

A wooden building of the first Municipal Theatre opened in the northern side of the park in the 1840s. Wooden rotunda to relax of citizens was erected in 1864. It was replaced by stone building located on Pushkinskaya street alongside of main park entrance in 1893. Architect Nikolai Doroshenko designed an open-work fence and front entrance constructed in the shape of fortress gates. New entrance was located on Bolshaya Sadovaya street. Architect Vladimir Shkitko projected the first fountain in Rostov-on-Don called 'Boy with basin'. The opening ceremony was  held in conjunction with relocation of the town council to new building (Maximov house). The fountain was officially opened by projector of water pipe Timofey Petrovich Kuska. Pool and arbors were decorated with sculptures opened in middle porch of the park. At the Lower Park was a stone grotto, reservoir with alive swans and fountains. Flower ornaments were regularly renovated. A large area of new exotic plants and flowers was laid out. Palm trees and tamarisks were brought from abroad.

Description 
While planting and land form in much of the park appear natural, it is in fact almost entirely landscaped. The park contains extensive walking tracks, seven fountains, rotunda, playgrounds, amusement rides, cafe, chess pavilion and parkways decorated with sculptures. Indoor attractions include observatory, Monument to Lenin and Monument of the Great October Revolution. In addition there are  open-air gallery in which  hosts expositions of applied art and works by Rostov artists.

References 

Tourist attractions in Rostov-on-Don
Amusement parks in Russia
Maxim Gorky
Cultural heritage monuments in Rostov-on-Don
Parks in Rostov-on-Don
Parks in Russia
Cultural heritage monuments of regional significance in Rostov Oblast